The Church of Saint Andrew is an Anglican church in Tangier, Morocco. Consecrated in 1905, the church is within the Archdeaconry of Gibraltar. The building is constructed in a Moorish architectural style.

History

In 1880, Hassan I of Morocco donated land to the British community in order to build a small Anglican church in Tangier. The resulting church was soon found to have insufficient capacity for the increasing number of worshippers, and a new building was constructed in 1894 which became the Church of Saint Andrew. It was consecrated in 1905. The interior is designed as a fusion of numerous styles, notably Moorish. The belltower, shaped like a minaret, overlooks the adjacent cemetery. Henri Matisse's painting of 1913, Landscape Viewed from a Window, depicts the church. The church has a number of memorial plaques, including one to commemorate Emily Keene, (1849-1944), Sherifa of Wazzan, who introduced the cholera vaccine to Morocco. She was a British humanitarian who married the Shareef of Ouazzane, a local religious leader. She died in Tangier and there is a plaque in the western side of the church to commemorate her - her actual grave is in the Wazzan family burial ground in the Marshan district of Tangier overlooking the Strait of Gibraltar. Another memorial commemorates Thomas Kirby-Green, one of the members of the Great Escape who was executed on recapture. The church is in the Archdeaconry of Gibraltar.

Notable burials
The churchyard holds the graves of a number of notable people:
 Sir Harry MacLean, (1848–1920), soldier and commander of the Moroccan Army;
 Paul Lund, (1915–1966), British gangster and friend of  William Burroughs;
 Walter Burton Harris, (1866–1933), a British diplomat, journalist and author;
 Claire de Menasce and her second husband Commander Roy Howell RN. Claude-Marie Vincendon, her daughter by her first marriage, was the third wife of Lawrence Durrell;
 Christopher Gibbs, (1938-2018), antique dealer and collector, credited with inventing Swinging London.

References

External links
Flickr images

Churches completed in 1894
19th-century Anglican church buildings
Churches in Tangier
Churches in Morocco
Anglican church buildings in Africa
Diocese in Europe
Tourist attractions in Tangier
19th-century architecture in Morocco